Schinus polygama, the Hardee peppertree or Chilean pepper tree, is a species of plant in the family Anacardiaceae native to Argentina and Chile and naturalized in California.

Taxonomy
The species name has been spelled Schinus polygamus, which according to the rules of the International Code of Nomenclature for algae, fungi, and plants (article 62.1) is incorrect Latin grammar, and is "to be corrected" to Schinus polygama. This is because botanical tradition uses feminine grammatical gender for the genus name Schinus, as is the classical tradition for most genus names of trees that end in -us, and polygama is an adjective that must take a feminine form (not the masculine form polygamus).

References

polygama
Taxa named by Ángel Lulio Cabrera
Taxa named by Antonio José Cavanilles